
Gmina Trzebiel is a rural gmina (administrative district) in Żary County, Lubusz Voivodeship, in western Poland, on the German border.

The gmina contains part of the protected area called Muskau Bend Landscape Park.

Villages
Gmina Trzebiel contains the villages and settlements of Bogaczów, Bronowice, Buczyny, Bukowina, Chudzowice, Chwaliszowice, Czaple, Dębinka, Gniewoszyce, Jasionów, Jędrzychowice, Jędrzychowiczki, Kałki, Kamienica nad Nysą Łużycką, Karsówka, Królów, Łuków, Marcinów, Mieszków, Niwica, Nowe Czaple, Olszyna, Przewoźniki, Pustków, Rytwiny, Siedlec, Siemiradz, Stare Czaple, Strzeszowice, Trzebiel, Wierzbięcin, Włostowice, Żarki Małe and Żarki Wielkie.

Neighbouring gminas
Gmina Trzebiel is bordered by the town of Łęknica and by the gminas of Brody, Lipinki Łużyckie, Przewóz and Tuplice. It also borders Germany.

Twin towns – sister cities

Gmina Trzebiel is twinned with:
 Lázně Libverda, Czech Republic
 Neiße-Malxetal, Germany

References

Trzebiel
Żary County